The Middlebush Village Historic District is a historic district located in the Village of Middlebush, an unincorporated community within Franklin Township, Somerset County, New Jersey. The district was added to the National Register of Historic Places on April 24, 2007.  It includes 37 contributing buildings and three contributing sites.

Architectural styles
The architectural styles of the district include Colonial Revival, Craftsman, Federal, Georgian, Gothic Revival, Greek Revival, and Italianate.

History

In 1701, a group of eight people bought a tract of 10,000 acres from John Harrison in what is now Franklin Township. They divided this Harrison Tract into eight plots and then into sixteen by drawing a north-south dividing line. This line eventually became a road, the Middle Line, now called South Middlebush Road. The other main road in the district is the east-west Amwell Road, which historically connected New Brunswick to Millstone, which was then the county seat of Somerset County. By 1704, two of the sons, John and Peter, of Cornelius Wyckoff, one of the original eight buyers, had settled in the Middlebush area.

Contributing properties
The Middlebush Reformed Church, located at the intersection of South Middlebush Road and Amwell Road, was built in 1919 to replace the original 1834 church. It is a mix of Gothic Revival and Craftsman styles.

The Voorhees House, located at 1719 Amwell Road,  was built in 1793 by P. Metz in a Georgian style. It is now the Stage House Tavern. The oldest building in the district, it was used in 1834 to organized the Middlebush Reformed Church. The location also includes a contributing large, red shingle, 19th-century Dutch barn.

The Middlebush School, located at 1755 Amwell Road, was built in 1926 as an elementary school. It is now known as the Franklin Township Board of Education Building.

The house at 17 South Middlebush Road was built  by John Wyckoff in a style between Greek Revival and Italianate.

The house at 53 South Middlebush Road was built  and was owned by Peter Brokaw.

The railroad station site on Railroad Avenue for the former Millstone and New Brunswick Railroad. The station was built in 1860 and torn down in 1948.

Gallery

See also
 Wyckoff-Garretson House

References

Bibliography

External links

 

Franklin Township, Somerset County, New Jersey
Historic districts on the National Register of Historic Places in New Jersey
American Craftsman architecture in New Jersey
Colonial Revival architecture in New Jersey
Federal architecture in New Jersey
Georgian architecture in New Jersey
Gothic Revival architecture in New Jersey
Greek Revival architecture in New Jersey
Italianate architecture in New Jersey
National Register of Historic Places in Somerset County, New Jersey
New Jersey Register of Historic Places